The pseudoautosomal regions, PAR1, PAR2, are homologous sequences of nucleotides on the X and Y chromosomes.

The pseudoautosomal regions get their name because any genes within them (so far at least 29 have been found for humans) are inherited just like any autosomal genes. PAR1 comprises 2.6 Mbp of the short-arm tips of both X and Y chromosomes in humans and great apes (X and Y are 154 Mbp and 62 Mbp in total). PAR2 is at the tips of the long arms, spanning 320 kbp.

Location

The locations of the PARs within GRCh38 are:

The locations of the PARs within GRCh37 are:

Inheritance and function
Normal male mammals have two copies of these genes: one in the pseudoautosomal region of their Y chromosome, the other in the corresponding portion of their X chromosome.  Normal females also possess two copies of pseudoautosomal genes, as each of their two X chromosomes contains a pseudoautosomal region. Crossing over between the X and Y chromosomes is normally restricted to the pseudoautosomal regions; thus, pseudoautosomal genes exhibit an autosomal, rather than sex-linked, pattern of inheritance.  So, females can inherit an allele originally present on the Y chromosome of their father.

The function of these pseudoautosomal regions is that they allow the X and Y chromosomes to pair and properly segregate during meiosis in males.

Genes

Pseudoautosomal genes are found in two different locations: PAR1 and PAR2. These are believed to have evolved independently.

PAR1
 pseudoautosomal PAR1
 AKAP17A
 ASMT
 ASMTL
 CD99
 CRLF2
 CSF2RA
 DHRSX
 GTPBP6
 IL3RA
 P2RY8
 PLCXD1
 PPP2R3B
 SHOX
 SLC25A6
 XG, which straddles the PAR1 region boundary
 ZBED1

in mice, some PAR1 genes have transferred to autosomes.

PAR2
 pseudoautosomal PAR2
 IL9R
 SPRY3
 VAMP7, also known as SYBL1
 CXYorf1, also known as FAM39A and now mapped to the pseudogene WASH6P, but of interest due to its proximity to the telomere.

Pathology
Pairing (synapsis) of the X and Y chromosomes and crossing over (recombination) between their pseudoautosomal regions appear to be necessary for the normal progression of male meiosis.  Thus, those cells in which X-Y recombination does not occur will fail to complete meiosis.  Structural and/or genetic dissimilarity (due to hybridization or mutation) between the pseudoautosomal regions of the X and Y chromosomes can disrupt pairing and recombination, and consequently cause male infertility.

The SHOX gene in the PAR1 region is the gene most commonly associated with and well understood with regards to disorders in humans, but all pseudoautosomal genes escape X-inactivation and are therefore candidates for having gene dosage effects in sex chromosome aneuploidy conditions (45,X, 47,XXX, 47,XXY, 47,XYY, etc.).

Deletions have also been associated with Léri-Weill dyschondrosteosis and Madelung's deformity.

See also
 Interleukin-3 receptor
 Interleukin-9 receptor

References

External links

  
 

Molecular genetics
Cytogenetics